Stephen Bennett (born 23 April 1959) is an English professional golfer.

Bennett was born in Cleethorpes. He turned professional in 1979 and won a place on the European Tour on his first visit to Qualifying School. He played on the Tour through much of the 1980s and 1990s, but didn't always manage to retain his tour card. His best season was 1985, when he finished 33rd on the Order of Merit, and picked up his only European Tour win at the Tunisian Open. He also won the 1986 Zimbabwe Open. After leaving the tour, he ran a golf academy called Swingtime in Grimsby. Bennett was coached by Eric Sharp, father in law to fellow professional Gordon J. Brand.

Professional wins (2)

European Tour wins (1)

European Tour playoff record (1–0)

Safari Circuit wins (1)

Results in major championships

Note: Bennett only played in The Open Championship.

CUT = missed the half-way cut
"T" = tied

Team appearances
PGA Cup (representing Great Britain and Ireland): 1998

References

External links

English male golfers
European Tour golfers
European Senior Tour golfers
People from Cleethorpes
1959 births
Living people